Morazán is a 2017 Honduran drama film directed by Hispano Durón. It was selected as the Honduran entry for the Best Foreign Language Film at the 90th Academy Awards, but it was not nominated. It was the first time Honduras had sent a film for consideration for the Best Foreign Language film.

Plot
In 1842 Costa Rica, the allies of General Francisco Morazán betray him.

Cast
 Orlando Valenzuela as Francisco Morazán
 Tito Estrada as Antonio Pinto Soares
 Melissa Merlo as María Josefa Lastiri
 Gabriel Ochoa as José Trinidad Cabañas

See also
 List of submissions to the 90th Academy Awards for Best Foreign Language Film
 List of Honduran submissions for the Academy Award for Best Foreign Language Film

References

External links
 

2017 films
2017 drama films
Honduran films
2010s Spanish-language films
Films set in 1842